The 1967 Notre Dame Fighting Irish football team represented the University of Notre Dame during the 1967 NCAA University Division football season.

Schedule

Roster

Game summaries

California

Purdue

Iowa

Southern Cal
Southern Cal won at Notre Dame for the first time since 1939, ending a string of 10 consecutive losses at Notre Dame Stadium. Despite entering the game ranked No. 1, the Trojans were a 12-point underdog against the No. 5 Fighting Irish, who committed nine turnovers (including seven intercepted passes).

Illinois

Michigan State

Navy

Pittsburgh

Georgia Tech
This was Notre Dame's 500th all-time football victory. The attendance of 60,034 was the largest at any football game in Georgia up to that point.

Miami (Florida) 
The crowd of 77,265 was the largest to attend a football game in Florida at the time. This was Notre Dame's third Friday night game in history; the others were in 1951 at Detroit and 1955 at Miami.

References

Notre Dame
Notre Dame Fighting Irish football seasons
Notre Dame Fighting Irish football